Les Evans may refer to:

 Les Evans (footballer, born 1909) (1909–1975), Australian rules footballer
 Les Evans (footballer, born 1929) (1929–2007), English footballer

See also
 Leslie Evans (born 1958), Scottish government policy adviser